Hodges Drive is a main west–east road in Joondalup, north of Perth, Western Australia. It begins in the suburb of Ocean Reef at a T-junction with Ocean Reef Road and runs through the residential areas in Ocean Reef, Connolly and Heathridge, before terminating at Joondalup Drive. The road continues from there as Grand Boulevard. Hodges Drive is a four lane dual-carriageway for its entire length.

History
Hodges Drive's construction began in February 1981, to connect the northern end of Marmion Avenue with Joondalup Drive. Its purpose was to allow for easier access to the Joondalup suburbs development especially the newly built Wanneroo District Hospital and the Shire of  Wanneroo's new administration buildings. Developed in two stages, the first clearing and establishing a limestone road base and the second, the sealing of the road with its completion as a two-lane road by the spring of 1981. A underpass for pedestrians was also built to Connolly to Heathridge.

The northern part of the Mitchell Freeway terminated at Hodges Drive between 1999 and 2008, and the road provides freeway access for residents in the Joondalup City area.

A project to duplicate Hodges Drive, turning it into a dual carriageway for its entire length, was completed by the end of June 2013.

Major intersections

 Ocean Reef Road - Ocean Reef
  Marmion Avenue (State Route 71) - Connolly, Heathridge, Currambine, Iluka, Beldon, Mullaloo
  Mitchell Freeway (State Route 2) - Craigie, Woodvale, Kingsley, Padbury
  Joondalup Drive (State Route 85) - Joondalup, Edgewater, Carramar, Tapping

See also

References

Roads in Perth, Western Australia
Joondalup
Articles containing video clips